Afzal Ali Shigri is a civil service officer and columnist in Pakistan. He served notably as Inspector General Police of Sindh, Commandant of the National Police Academy, Commandant of the Frontier Constabulary and Director General of the national National Police Bureau. He was also the first Inspector General of Police of National Highways & Motorway Police. He joined The Police Service of Pakistan in 1968, where he also served as Assistant Superintendent of Police, Superintendent of Police, Deputy Inspector General of Police and Inspector General Police. He retired in 2002. He is still active as a security analyst. and writer. He writes columns for Pakistan's largest English newspaper Dawn and other newspapers of Pakistan .

References

Living people
Balti people
Inspector Generals of Sindh Police
Pakistani civil servants
Year of birth missing (living people)